The Arizona Diamondbacks Radio Networks are 2 radio networks, of 24 total stations with 2 F.M. translators, carrying games of the Arizona Diamondbacks. There is an English-language network consisting of 20 stations and a Spanish-language network of five stations, including four in Mexico. The English-language network originates at KTAR/620 and KMVP-FM/98.7 in Phoenix, Arizona, while the Spanish-language network originates at KHOV-FM/105.1 serving Phoenix.  The main play-by-play announcer on the English-language network is Greg Schulte.  The color analyst is former major-leaguer Tom Candiotti.  The games' pre- & post-game host is Jeff Munn who also fills in on play-by-play.  On the Spanish-language network, the play-by-play announcer is Oscar Soria and the color analyst is Miguel Quintana. Arturo Ochoa is the fill-in Spanish play-by-play announcer, and the fill-in color analyst is Richard Saenz.

Station list

Flagships

United States

Arizona

New Mexico

Mexico
All four Mexican affiliates are in the state of Sonora and owned by Grupo Larsa Comunicaciones.

Unsure status

Former flagships

Former affiliates

Notes:
Spanish-language stations are listed in italics.
Translators are listed smaller than full-power stations.

References

External links
Radio Networks affiliates' page on the Diamondbacks' site
Announcers' biographies on the Diamondbacks' page

Arizona Diamondbacks
Major League Baseball on the radio
Sports radio networks in the United States